The 2012 Edmonton Eskimos season was the 55th season for the team in the Canadian Football League and their 64th overall. The Eskimos finished in 4th place in the West Division with a 7–11 record but still managed to make the playoffs for the second straight season via the CFL's "crossover" rule. The Eskimos played the Toronto Argonauts in the East Semi-Final and lost 42–26.

Offseason

CFL draft
The 2012 CFL Draft took place on May 3, 2012 live at 1:00 PM MDT. The Eskimos had five selections in the six-round draft, including two in the first round after trading Ricky Ray to the Toronto Argonauts.

Notable transactions 

*Later traded to the BC Lions
**Later traded to the Calgary Stampeders
***Later traded back to the Saskatchewan Roughriders

Preseason

Regular season

Season standings

Season schedule
The Edmonton Eskimos clinched a playoff game against the Toronto Argonauts with an Argonauts victory and a Hamilton Tiger-Cats the night before, allowing the Eskimos team to cross-over into the East Divisional Playoffs. The Eskimos would go on to lose against the same Argonauts team that allowed them to clinch the last playoff spot in the CFL during the 2012 CFL season. Had the Hamilton Tiger-Cats beat the Toronto Argonauts lost, the Eskimos final game against Calgary on November 2 would have been a game where they needed to win or tie to clinch a playoff berth. 

Total attendance: 308,866 
Average attendance: 34,318 (57.6%)

Roster

Coaching staff

Playoffs

Schedule

East Semi-Final

References

Edmonton Elks seasons
Edmont
2012 in Alberta